Jon Arbuckle is a character in Garfield.

John or Jon Arbuckle may also refer to:
John Arbuckle (businessman), American businessman
John Arbuckle (politician), see 15th General Assembly of Prince Edward Island
John Arbuckle of John Arbuckle v. Joseph E Blackburn, see List of United States Supreme Court cases, volume 191

See also